Luke Spokes (born 6 August 2000) is an English professional footballer who plays as a midfielder for National League South side Bath City.

Spokes began his career in Non-League football and played for Mangotsfield United, Yate Town and Taunton Town before signing a professional contract with Grimsby Town in the summer of 2020 whilst they were members of the EFL. He has also played for Boston United and Spennymoor Town on loan.

Early life
He is originally from Westbury-on-Trym, Bristol. He studied at Redland Green school for years (7-11)

Career

Early career
Spokes signed for Mangotsfield United in September 2018 after playing at South Gloucestershire and Stroud College under Dave Hockaday. After a trial at Burnley and interest from other professional clubs, he moved up one division to sign for Yate Town, before moving on to Taunton Town in January 2020.

Grimsby Town
In September 2020 Spokes moved into professional football after signing a one-year contract with Ian Holloway's Grimsby Town. He scored his first professional goal when he scored the only goal of the game with a 20 yard strike with his left foot away at relegation rivals Barrow on 23 March 2021.

On 25 September 2021 having yet to have make an appearance during the 2021–22 season, Spokes joined Boston United on a one-month loan. Spokes made his debut later that day and came off the bench in a 2-1 victory over Guiseley. Spokes made a total of six appearances during his month on loan with Boston, three of which came in the League.

On 18 November 2021, Spokes signed for National League North side Spennymoor Town on a three-month loan. Spokes scored goals in a 4-2 win against Chester and a 3-1 victory in the FA Trophy over Plymouth Parkway. In February 2022, the loan deal was extended until the end of the season. He was praised by Spennymoor co-manager Anthony Johnson for his work ethic.

Grimsby secured promotion with victory in the play-off final, though Spokes was not in the matchday squad at London Stadium.

On 11 June 2022, the club announced their retained list ahead of the 2022–23 season and confirmed that Spokes would be among those released when his contract expires on 30 June.

Bath City
On 5 July 2022, Spokes signed for Bath City.

Career statistics

References

Living people
English footballers
Association football midfielders
Mangotsfield United F.C. players
Yate Town F.C. players
Taunton Town F.C. players
Grimsby Town F.C. players
Boston United F.C. players
Spennymoor Town F.C. players
Bath City
2000 births